During the 1989–90 English football season, Queens Park Rangers competed in the First Division for the seventh year running.

Season summary
QPR finished in a mid-table position of 11th in the First Division. After a poor start to the season that saw them win just twice in their first twelve League matches, they sacked their player-manager Trevor Francis and appointed Don Howe in his place. They reached the sixth round of the FA Cup in a run that encompassed nine matches, including five replays, before they were finally knocked out by Liverpool.

Results
Queens Park Rangers' score comes first

Football League First Division

FA Cup

League Cup

Squad
Squad at end of season

Left club during season

Notes

References

Queens Park Rangers F.C. seasons
Queens Park Rangers
Queens Park Rangers F.C.